Konar Torshan (also Romanized as Konār Torshān and Kenar Torshan) is a village in Abdan Rural District of Abdan District of Deyr County, Bushehr province, Iran. At the 2006 census, its population was 256 in 44 households. The following census in 2011 counted 251 people in 53 households. The latest census in 2016 showed a population of 230 people in 59 households; it was the largest village in its rural district.

References 

Populated places in Deyr County